Wheatbelt or wheat belt may refer to:
 Wheatbelt (Australia), areas of Australia where wheat has been produced
 Wheatbelt (Western Australia), one of the nine regions of Western Australia
 Wheat belt (North America), the part of North America where wheat is the primary crop

See also
 Avon Wheatbelt, an Australian bioregion in Western Australia
 Breadbasket, any region that produces a lot of wheat or other grain, including a list of regions worldwide